The Carry On Christmas Specials were four one-off specials produced for Thames Television made in 1969, 1970, 1972 and 1973. They brought most of the cast and the formula of the Carry On films to a television production. Barbara Windsor was the only one to appear in all four Carry On Christmas specials. Kenneth Williams (who appeared in twenty-six Carry On films, the most of any of the Carry On stars) did not appear in any of the Christmas specials.

Carry on Christmas (1969)

Description

The first special, Carry On Christmas, was broadcast in 1969.  It was filmed shortly after the completion of Carry on Up the Jungle and featured the same main cast from that film.  It was scripted by long-term Carry On author Talbot Rothwell. The story was an irreverent take on Charles Dickens' A Christmas Carol, featuring Sid James as Scrooge. The 'Christmas Past' sequence reveals that Scrooge failed to invest in the schemes of Dr. Frank N. Stein, who (assisted by his servant, Count Dracula) sought to create a mate for Barbara Windsor's Monster. The 'Christmas Present' sequence described Robert Browning's difficulties in attempting to elope with Elizabeth Barrett without funds, thanks to Scrooge's unwillingness to lend. The 'Christmas Future' sequence retold the story of Cinderella.

Cast

Carry on Again Christmas (1970)

Description
The second special, Carry On Again Christmas, was shown the following year. Rothwell did not script this episode, but Sid Colin, who had co-written Carry On Spying with Rothwell, wrote the episode with Dave Freeman, who would go on to script Carry On Behind, several episodes of the Carry On Laughing television series, and was the co-writer of the 1992 film, Carry On Columbus. Based on the Robert Louis Stevenson story Treasure Island, this episode saw the Carry on debut of Wendy Richard, who would go on to have small roles in Carry On Matron and Carry On Girls.

Although the 1969 special was broadcast in colour, the 1970 special was shown in black and white due to a technicians' strikes that caused Thames Television to broadcast all their Christmas shows that year in black and white.

Cast

Carry on Christmas (or Carry On Stuffing) (1972)

Description

In 1972 a new Christmas special was produced, entitled Carry On Christmas (or Carry On Stuffing). Talbot Rothwell became ill whilst writing the script, and was unable to finish it. Dave Freeman had to be brought in to complete the script, but the two men did not work together. Charles Hawtrey pulled out of the special at short notice. Having taken third billing to Sid James and Terry Scott in the previous two shows, and knowing they would both be absent, Hawtrey demanded top billing. But Carry On producer Peter Rogers refused, giving top billing to Hattie Jacques instead. Hawtrey's role had hastily to be recast, and was split between Norman Rossington and Brian Oulton, both of whom had played cameo roles in several Carry On films. The special featured a collection of historical sketches, loosely linked around an 18th-century banquet.

It included a performance of two madrigals originally written for Carry On Henry. The songs reappeared in the 1973 stage show Carry On London.

Cast

Carry on Christmas (1973)

Description
For the final original Christmas special, writer Talbot Rothwell returned, as did Sid James. In a modern-day setting, it features Sid James as a department store Father Christmas, whose out-of-character behaviour puts him at odds with the store manager. James also introduces sketches set in Christmases past, and a "Carry On" ballet performance.

Cast

Carry on Laughing's Christmas Classics (1983)
Kenneth Williams and Barbara Windsor introduce some of the funniest moments from the later Carry On films, in a format very similar to the film That's Carry On!.

DVD release
In 2005, the first four specials were released on DVD, featuring interviews with series producer Peter Rogers and stars Jack Douglas and Wendy Richard.

References

External links
Carry On Films at The Whippit Inn
Carry On Line: Official Website of the Carry On films 

Carry On (franchise)
Christmas television specials
ITV sitcoms
English-language television shows
Television shows produced by Thames Television
Television shows based on A Christmas Carol